Anti-Arabism in Kurdistan refers to the opposition, hostility, hatred, distrust, fear, and general dislike of Arabs or Arab culture in Greater Kurdistan and amongst Kurds.

History 
Anti-Arabism boosted among Kurds after the Anfal campaign, ISIS attacks, and an increasing number of Arab refugees, settlers, immigrants, and visitors to Iraqi Kurdistan, and Rojava. Anti-Arabism also increased among Turkish Kurds after one-third of the Syrian refugees in Turkey went to Turkish Kurdistan.

The Kurds who tend to be the most Anti-Arab are the far-right Kurdish nationalists, fascists, and the Kurdish Islamists.

The main reason for Anti-Arabism amongst Kurds is the Anfal campaign, as well as Saddam Hussein's Arabization of Kurdish areas in Iraq which led to a huge wave of Kurds leaving their homes. 1.5 to 2 million Kurds were forcibly displaced by Arabization campaigns in Iraq between 1963 and 1987; resulting in 10,000 to 100,000 deaths during the displacement.

Another reason is the ISIS attacks, and the Northern Iraq offensive by ISIS.

The Iraqi Kurdish Government's kind treatment to Arab immigrants, refugees, and visitors despite the persecution of Kurds by Arabs in the disputed regions have not only led to increased Anti-Arabism, but also an Anti-Government sentiment by Kurds. Around the same time that Arabs driven out over 70,000 Kurds from Mosul, the Kurdistan Regional Government allowed about 75,000 Arab individuals to live in Iraqi Kurdistan.

Notable Anti-Arab attacks  
In 2015, many Kurdish young men, in anger at the increasing number of Arabs in Iraqi Kurdistan, began a mass protest, starting in Erbil's Arab Quarter. Protestors chanted "Arabs are traitors" and other Anti-Arab chants while they marched, while stopping near known Arab homes or businesses and intensifying their chants, with some even throwing stones at the buildings and windows, until Kurdish Police attacked the protesters with tazers and batons.

After the liberation of Makhmur from ISIS, Kurdish residents claimed that a number of Arabs helped ISIS capture the city, supplying them with information on terrain and security forces in the area as well as with food and fuel. Kurdish Peshmerga forces retook the town a few days later, which they currently control it. During an interview, an angry Peshmerga soldier smoked cigarettes and calmly explained to VICE News that he and many other Kurds would like to kick all Arabs out from the region in the most ruthless way possible. "90 percent of Kurds are now dedicated to the same brutality towards Arabs as they showed to us, we want the destruction of those dogs. We will kill them as soon as the cameras aren't here", he said. Kurdish Security officers also prevented displaced Arabs from returning to the town.

Many Kurds criticized the Kurdish Government for allowing displaced Arabs in the region, stating that "Arabs should not be allowed to roam freely around Iraqi Kurdistan, special camps should be made to house them" and "Everyone here is regretting the fact that Erbil houses a large Arab population, we have a reckless open-door policy."

In January 2021, a group of Kurds in Erbil stormed a highway and attacked many cars with Arabs, mostly visitors from Iraq, sitting in them.

Arab-Kurdish clashes have also been going on in Syria and Rojava.

See also 
 Xenophobia and racism in the Middle East
 Anti-Arabism in Turkey
 Antisemitism

References 

Anti-Arabism in the Middle East
Racism in the Middle East